RUCAPS (Riyadh University Computer Aided Production System) was a computer aided design (CAD) system for architects, first developed during the 1970s and 1980s, and today credited as a forerunner of Building Information Modelling (BIM). It ran on minicomputers from Prime Computer and Digital Equipment Corporation (DEC).

Development
The system was initially developed by two graduates of Liverpool University, Dr John Davison and John Watts in the early 1970s. They took their work to architects Gollins Melvin Ward (GMW Architects) in London in the late 1970s, and developed it whilst working on a project for Riyadh University. It became the Really Universal Computer Aided Production System (RUCAPS), and from 1977 was sold through GMW Computers Ltd in several countries worldwide. The term 'building model' (in the sense of BIM as used today) was first used in papers in the mid-1980s: in a 1985 paper by Simon Ruffle, and later in a 1986 paper by Robert Aish - then at GMW Computers - referring to the software's use at London's Heathrow Airport.

RUCAPS was a significant milestone in the development of building modellers, selling many hundreds of copies during the early 1980s when CAD was rare and expensive, and introducing thousands of architects to computer aided design. It is regarded as a forerunner to today's BIM software, and is seen by some writers, e.g.: Jerry Laiserin, as the inspiration behind Autodesk's Revit:

While Autodesk Revit may not contain genomic snippets of Reflex code, Revit clearly is spiritual heir to a lineage of BIM "begats" — RUCAPS begat Sonata, Sonata begat Reflex, and Reflex begat Revit.

RUCAPS was superseded in the mid-late 1980s by Sonata, developed by former GMW employee Jonathan Ingram. This was sold to T2 Solutions (renamed from GMW Computers in 1987), which was eventually bought by Alias|Wavefront but then "disappeared in a mysterious, corporate black hole, somewhere in eastern Canada in 1992." Ingram then went on to develop Reflex, bought out by Parametric Technology Corporation (PTC) in 1996.

Comparison with BIM
In 1984, RUCAPS was described as a 2½ dimensional interactive system, closer to the philosophy of 2D interactive systems such as ARK/2 or DAISY, and concentrating on the rapid production of 2D drawings (plans, elevations and sections). During the early 1980s, Ingram worked on a supplementary 3D file structure for RUCAPS, where, by running a separate program and with manual intervention, a flat 3D file could be generated, allowing the production of perspectives and images. RUCAPS did carry the 'weather vane' concept from UK-based Applied Research's Building Design System, BDS, now found in most modern BIM systems, but did not have interactive 3D windows or rule-based language - core characteristics of today's BIM applications.

The system
RUCAPS was a building modelling system. It used the concept, introduced by BDS, of 2½ dimensional representation of components, straddling the divide between two dimensions (2D, i.e. flat) and three (3D). Here, all the elements of the design were placed in space in three dimensions, but each element, such as a window, door, chair or wall, was modelled in a series of 2D views. These views were of the plan and two elevations, each of which were drawn conventionally, as though on the side of a glass box. The "box" was then moved about the design and placed. By looking down on the model the plan view of the whole model was visible, and from the side just the elevation was seen. Because moving the component, or "box", moved both the plan view and the elevations for it, the plans and elevations remained in harmony, and designer's time was saved.

RUCAPS consisted of 38 different programs. For example, there was a program to generate the geometry for building components, another to assemble them into groups, and another to assemble those sub-assemblies into a model of the building. A dozen or more modules took care of printing, copying of floors, printing schedules, and so on. In the way of the time, the user directed operations by calling up the relevant program module rather than, as today, selecting from a menu.

A large computer screen displayed the building model. The screen, or sometimes two screens, was controlled from a keyboard for launching programs, and typing in coordinate data. Basic components were given several 2D views, from the top and sides. The information was usually coded onto A4 sheets of paper, and typed in as a series of coordinates. Once available to use in the building module, the components would be located using a large digitizer. This permitted a base drawing to be taped down, and used for locating the new components. The screen was then used to help ensure accuracy.

Along the bottom of the digitizer was a template with commands which could be selected as required, so the keyboard was often not required. Assembly was aided for many users by the familiar look of the large digitizer, which looked much like the drawing boards common at the time. To aid the process of aclimatistion, the digitizer was used with an electronic pen, which made placing components both quick and accurate.

Mini computers were used to power the system. Initially single-user, the system soon graduated to larger computers that could handle eight or more workstations simultaneously. The nature of building modeling systems is that very little information needs to be transferred from the database to the workstation, so performance levels were good despite what looks like limited equipment. Most early display screens were monochrome, but later RUCAPS systems were colour. All were using vector graphics, which was a step up from the earlier storage tubes. Plotters were large format and pen based, using a mix of roller ball pens and Rotring wet ink pens of several thicknesses and colour.

RUCAPS was expensive, as was all CAD at the time, so its use was confined to large building projects. It was then necessary to have several people working on the same model. An early multi-user system was developed, allowing single building models to be worked on simultaneously by many people. It was a system that employed layers, where components were allocated categories allowing groups of them to be switched off or on when the drawings were produced. Layering allowed, for example, drainage to be printed separately from electrical components, but still maintained on the single model. No 3D was available in RUCAPS though a totally separate 3D modelling and perspective hidden-line program called AUTOPROD written by Col. Nigel Hitch was sold alongside RUCAP. There was no database or modelling connection of any sort between RUCAPS and AUTOPROD.

No clash-detection or calculations were undertaken on the model, but some hiding of one component by another was possible so that external walls showed on elevations while the internal elements were concealed in a 2½D fashion.

Notes and references

Data modeling
Computer-aided design software
Building information modeling